Lorrainville is a municipality in northwestern Quebec, Canada, in the Témiscamingue Regional County Municipality. It was founded in 1907 by Isaïe Douaire, who was a farmer from Ville Marie.

Demographics
Population trend:
 Population in 2006: 1325 (2001 to 2006 population change: -6.1%)
 Population in 2001: 1411
 Population in 1996: 1507
 Population in 1991: 1452

Private dwellings occupied by usual residents: 533 (total dwellings: 564)

Mother tongue:
 English as first language: 0.7%
 French as first language: 94.4%
 English and French as first language: 0%
 Other as first language: 4.9%

See also
 List of municipalities in Quebec

References

Municipalities in Quebec
Incorporated places in Abitibi-Témiscamingue
Designated places in Quebec
Témiscamingue Regional County Municipality